Georg Jürgenson (1898–?) was an Estonian politician. He was a member of II Riigikogu. He was a member of the Riigikogu since 22 November 1924. He replaced Aleksander Rimmel. On 18 December 1924, he was removed from his position and he was replaced by Jüri Kurul.

References

1898 births
Year of death missing
Workers' United Front politicians
Members of the Riigikogu, 1923–1926